The Paul R. Halmos – Lester R. Ford Award (formerly known as the Lester R. Ford Award) is a $1,000 prize given annually by the Mathematical Association of America for authors of articles of expository excellence published in The American Mathematical Monthly or Mathematics Magazine. It is awarded to at most four authors each year. 
The prize was established in 1964 as the Lester R. Ford Award to honor the contributions of mathematician and former MAA president Lester R. Ford.  In 2012 the award was renamed the Paul R. Halmos – Lester R. Ford Award to honor the contributions of former The American Mathematical Monthly editor Paul R. Halmos and the support of the Halmos family for the awards. Halmos himself received the award in 1971 and 1977.

Recipients 
The recipients of the Paul R. Halmos – Lester R. Ford Award are:

 2022: William Dunham
 2022: Jan E. Holly
 2022: Dominic Klyve and Erik R. Tou
 2022: David Lowry-Duda and Miles H. Wheeler

 2021: J. H. Conway, M. S. Paterson, and Moscow (U.S.S.R.)
 2021: Brian S. Thomson
 2021: Zhaodong Cai, Matthew Faust, A. J. Hildebrand, Junxian Li, and Yuan Zhang
 2021: Ben Blum-Smith and Japheth Wood

 2020: Daniel Ullman and Daniel Velleman
 2020: Colin Adams, Allison Henrich, Kate Kearney, and Nicholas Scoville
 2020: John B. Little
 2020: Balázs Gerencsér and Viktor Harangi
 2019:  Adrian Rice
 2019:  Jonathan Borwein and Robert M. Corless
 2019:  Andrew Granville
 2019:  Kenneth S. Williams
 2018:  Paul E. Becker, Martin Derka, Sheridan Houghten and Jennifer Ulrich
 2018:  Maria Deijfen, Alexander E. Holroyd and James B. Martin
 2018:  Francis E. Su
 2018:  Michael Barnsley and Andrew Vince
 2017:  Deborah Kent and David Muraki
 2017:  Adrien Kassel and David B. Wilson
 2017:  Lawrence Zalcman
 2017:  Harold P. Boas
 2016:  Zhiqin Lu and Julie Rowlett
 2016:  Manya Raman-Sundström
 2016:  Kenneth S. Williams
 2016:  Alex Chin, Gary Gordon, Kellie MacPhee, and Charles Vincent
 2015:  Mario Ponce and Patricio Santibanez
 2015:  Erwan Brugallé and Kristin Shaw
 2015:  Daniel Velleman
 2015:  Allison Henrich and Louis H Kauffman
 2014:  Will Traves
 2014:  Susan H. Marshall and Alexander R. Perlis
 2014:  Jacques Lévy Véhel and Franklin Mendivil
 2014:  Tadashi Tokieda
 2013:  Robert T. Jantzen and Klaus Volpert
 2013:  Lionel Levine and Katherine E. Stange
 2013:  Dimitris Koukoulopoulos and Johann Thiel
 2013:  Dan Kalman and Mark McKinzie

The recipients of the Lester R. Ford Award are:

 2012:  David A. Cox
 2012:  Graham Everest and Tom Ward
 2012:  Peter Sarnak
 2012:  Ravi Vakil
 2011:  Aaron Abrams and Skip Garibaldi
 2011:  Alexander Borisov, Mark Dickinson, and Stuart Hastings
 2011:  James T. Smith
 2011:  Mark Conger and Jason Howald
 2011:  Marvin Jay Greenberg
 2010:  Bob Palais, Richard Palais, and Stephen Rodi
 2010:  Jerzy Kocik and Andrzej Solecki
 2010:  Judith Grabiner
 2010:  Mike Paterson and Uri Zwick
 2010:  Tom M. Apostol and Mamikon A. Mnatsakanian
 2009:  Andrew Bashelor, Amy Ksir, and Will Traves
 2009:  Andrew Granville
 2009:  Dan Kalman
 2009:  Michel Balinski
 2008:  Andrew Cohen and Tanya Leise
 2008:  David Auckly
 2008:  Katherine Socha
 2008:  Thomas C. Hales
 2008:  Tom M. Apostol and Mamikon A. Mnatsakanian
 2007:  Andrew Granville and Greg Martin
 2007:  Harold P. Boas
 2007:  Jeffrey C. Lagarias
 2007:  Lluís Bibiloni, Jaume Paradís, and Pelegrí Viader
 2007:  Michael J. Mossinghoff
 2006:  Edward B. Burger
 2006:  Ibetsam Bajunaid, Joel M. Cohen, Flavia Colonna, and David Singman
 2006:  Karl Dilcher and Kenneth B. Stolarsky
 2006:  Viktor Blåsjö
 2006:  William Dunham
 2005:  Alan Edelman and Gilbert Strang
 2005:  Henry Cohn
 2005:  Judith Grabiner
 2005:  Steven Finch and John Wetzel
 2005:  Tom Apostol and Mamikon Mnatsakanian
 2004:  Charles Livingston
 2004:  Noam Elkies
 2004:  R. Michael Range
 2004:  Ruediger Thiele
 2003:  Eleanor Robson
 2003:  Leonard Gillman
 2003:  Sam Northshield
 2003:  Sergio B. Volchan
 2003:  Warren P. Johnson
 2002:  David Lindsay Roberts
 2002:  Dirk Huylebrouck
 2002:  Greg Martin
 2002:  Peter Borwein & Loki Jorgenson
 2001:  E.R. Scheinerman
 2001:  Keith Kendig
 2000:  P.J. McKenna
 2000:  Vilmos Totik
 2000:  William Terrell
 1999:  Bernd Sturmfels
 1999:  Jerry L. Kazdan
 1999:  Yoav Benyamini
 1998:  Bruce Pourciau
 1998:  Judith V. Grabiner
 1998:  S. C. Coutinho
 1997:  Alan F. Beardon
 1997:  John Brillhart and Patrick Morton
 1997:  Robert G. Bartle
 1996:  John Oprea
 1996:  Martin Aigner
 1996:  Sheldon Axler
 1995:  Fernando Q. Gouvea
 1995:  Israel Kleiner
 1995:  Jonathan L. King
 1995:  N. Movshovitz-Hadar
 1995:  Robert Gray
 1995:  William C. Waterhouse
 1994:  Bruce C. Berndt
 1994:  Dan Velleman
 1994:  Edgar R. Lorch
 1994:  Istvan Szalkai
 1994:  Joseph H. Silverman
 1994:  Leonard Gillman
 1994:  Reuben Hersh
 1994:  S. Bhargava
 1993:  Carsten Thomassen
 1993:  Donald E. Knuth
 1992:  Clement W.H. Lam
 1991:  Edward Scheinerman
 1991:  Frances Yao
 1991:  Joyce Justicz
 1991:  Marcel Y. Berger
 1991:  Peter Winkler
 1991:  Ronald L. Graham
 1990:  Chee K. Yap
 1990:  Doron Zeilberger
 1990:  Jacob Goodman
 1990:  Janos Pach
 1989:  Bruce C. Berndt
 1989:  Gert Almkvist
 1989:  Richard Guy
 1988:  James Epperson
 1988:  Stan Wagon
 1987:  David Yost
 1987:  Howard Hiller
 1987:  Jacob Korevaar
 1987:  Joan Cleary
 1987:  Peter Neumann
 1987:  Sidney Morris
 1987:  Stuart S. Antman
 1986:  Jeffrey Lagarias
 1986:  Michael Taylor
 1985:  Donald G. Saari
 1985:  John B. Urenko
 1985:  John D. Dixon
 1984:  Joel Spencer
 1984:  John W. Milnor
 1984:  Judith Grabiner
 1984:  Roger E. Howe
 1984:  William C. Waterhouse
 1983:  Robert F. Brown
 1983:  Robert S. Strichartz
 1983:  Tony Rothman
 1982:  Philip J. Davis
 1982:  R. Arthur Knoebel
 1981:  Alan H. Schoenfeld
 1981:  Bruce H. Pourciau
 1981:  Edward R. Swart
 1981:  Lawrence A. Zalcman
 1981:  R. Creighton Buck
 1980:  Cathleen S. Morawetz
 1980:  David Gale
 1980:  Desmond P. Fearnley-Sander
 1980:  Karel Hrbacek
 1980:  Robert Osserman
 1979:  Bradley Efron
 1979:  Joseph B. Kruskal
 1979:  Kenneth I. Gross
 1979:  Lawrence A. Shepp
 1979:  Ned Glick
 1978:  Louis H. Kauffman
 1978:  Neil J.A. Sloane
 1978:  Ralph P. Boas
 1978:  Thomas F. Banchoff
 1977:  Daihachiro Sato
 1977:  Donald S. Passman
 1977:  Douglas Wiens
 1977:  Hideo Wada
 1977:  J.H. Ewing
 1977:  James P. Jones
 1977:  Joseph B. Keller
 1977:  Paul R. Halmos
 1977:  S.H. Moolgavkar
 1977:  Shreeram Shankar Abhyankar
 1977:  William H. Gustafson
 1977:  William H. Wheeler
 1977:  William P. Ziemer
 1976:  Branko Grunbaum
 1976:  David W. McLaughlin
 1976:  Edward A. Bender
 1976:  H.P. Young
 1976:  James E. Humphreys
 1976:  Jay R. Goldman
 1976:  Joseph B. Keller
 1976:  Justin J. Price
 1976:  Michel L. Balinski
 1975:  Donald E. Knuth
 1975:  J. Callahan
 1975:  Johannes C.C. Nitsche
 1975:  Lawrence A. Zalcman
 1975:  R. Ayoub
 1975:  Sherman K. Stein
 1974:  Garrett Birkhoff
 1974:  I.J. Schoenberg
 1974:  Lynn Arthur Steen
 1974:  Martin D. Davis
 1974:  Patrick Billingsley
 1974:  R.J. Wilson
 1973:  Jean A. Dieudonne
 1973:  Lynn Arthur Steen
 1973:  Peter D. Lax
 1973:  Raymond L. Wilder
 1973:  Samuel Karlin
 1973:  Thomas L. Saaty
 1972:  Frederick Cunningham, Jr.
 1972:  Gulbank D. Chakerian
 1972:  Leon Henkin
 1972:  Lester H. Lange
 1972:  Paul M. Cohn
 1972:  Victor Klee
 1972:  William J. Ellison
 1971:  Eric Langford
 1971:  George Forsythe
 1971:  Jean A. Dieudonne
 1971:  Olga Taussky
 1971:  Paul R. Halmos
 1971:  Peter V. O'Neil
 1970:  Henry L. Alder
 1970:  Ivan Niven
 1970:  John W. Milnor
 1970:  Norman Levinson
 1970:  Ralph P. Boas
 1970:  William A. Coppel
 1969:  Albert Wilansky
 1969:  George Forsythe
 1969:  Harley Flanders
 1969:  Hassler Whitney
 1969:  Marcel F. Neuts
 1969:  Pierre Samuel
 1968:  Daniel Pedoe
 1968:  Frederick Cunningham, Jr.
 1968:  Hans J. Zassenhaus
 1968:  Keith L. Phillips
 1968:  Margaret Maxfield and F. V. Waugh
 1968:  W.F. Newns
 1967:  D.R. Fulkerson
 1967:  M.Z. Nashed
 1967:  Mark Kac
 1967:  Paul B. Yale
 1967:  Wai-Kai Chen
 1966:  Carl B. Allendoerfer
 1966:  Henryk Minc
 1966:  Marvin Marcus
 1966:  Peter D. Lax
 1965:  Elmer Tolsted
 1965:  Hartley Rogers, Jr.
 1965:  Louis Brand
 1965:  R. Duncan Luce
 1965:  R.H. Bing
 1965:  Robert G. Kuller

See also

 List of mathematics awards

References

External links
 Paul R. Halmos - Lester R. Ford Awards on the website of the Mathematical Association of America. Includes a list of past recipients.

Awards of the Mathematical Association of America